The Case Against Brooklyn is a 1958 film noir crime film directed by Paul Wendkos, starring Darren McGavin and Margaret Hayes, and based on the True Magazine article "I Broke the Brooklyn Graft Scandal" by crime reporter Ed Reid.  The film features depictions of American police corruption, though no police officer in uniform is shown to be corrupt.

Plot
In an attempt to combat police corruption, newly graduated rookie cops are recruited to serve undercover to find information on a complex illegal betting network in Brooklyn. One of these officers, ex-Marine Pete Harris, formerly with Military Intelligence in Japan, is tasked to make the acquaintance of a woman whose husband was recently murdered by the Mob over gambling debts.

Cast

Further reading

References

External links

 John Grant  The Case Against Brooklyn @ Noirish
 The Case Against Brooklyn  Internet Movie Cars Database

1958 films

1958 crime films
1950s American films
1950s English-language films
1950s police films
American black-and-white films
American crime films
American police films
Columbia Pictures films
Film noir
Films about corruption in the United States
Films about police corruption
Films based on newspaper and magazine articles
Films directed by Paul Wendkos
Films produced by Charles H. Schneer
Films set in 1951
Films set in Brooklyn